The Care Bears are a group of characters created by the American Greetings company in 1981.  Since 1985, they have appeared in nine animated feature films.  The first three, made by the Canadian company Nelvana during the mid-1980s, were traditionally cel-animated; all subsequent entries (from 2004 onward) have been in CGI.  Nelvana produced the first five films, while Los Angeles-based SD Entertainment has made another four (starting with Care Bears: Oopsy Does It! in 2007).

Films

Nelvana

SD Entertainment

Cast

Notes

References

External links

Film series introduced in 1985
 List
Animated film series
 List
 List
Children's film series
Lists of American animated films